Malacca Zoo, officially the Malacca Zoo and Night Safari, is a  zoological park located beside Lebuh Ayer Keroh (Federal Route 143) in Ayer Keroh, Malacca, Malaysia, which hosts more than 1200 animals including 215 species of birds, amphibians, reptiles, mammals. It is the second-largest zoo in Malaysia behind the National Zoo of Malaysia, both were established in 1963. The zoo acts as both a rescue base and an animal sanctuary and was initially owned by the Malacca State Government, but its management was taken over by the Department of Wildlife and National Parks of Malaysia in 1979 and later opened to the public by the then Prime Minister, Tun Dr. Mahathir bin Mohammad on 13 August 1987.

Malacca Zoo was the first zoo in Malaysia to exhibit the critically endangered Sumatran rhinoceros. Other species exhibited in the zoo, both local and foreign, included the white rhinoceros, Asian elephants, red panda, Malaysian gaur, the serow, the squirrel monkey, the molurus python, the grey wolf, the Mongolian wild horse, the green tree python, the giraffe, the blue-and-yellow macaw and also the Indochinese tiger as well as the Malayan tiger

Attractions 

Some other attractions at the zoo includes:
 A mini safari
 A multi-animal show
 An elephant show
 Elephant & horse rides
 A souvenir shop at the exit
 Night Zoo

See also 
 Tourism in Malaysia
 National Zoo of Malaysia

References

External links 

 Tourism Malaysia – Zoo Melaka
 Melaka Zoo's profile at the Department of Wildlife and National Parks Malaysia
 Melaka Zoo at Melaka.net
 Melaka Zoo on the map.
 Zoo Melaka's info at AmazingMelaka.com

Ayer Keroh
Zoos in Malaysia
Buildings and structures in Malacca
Tourist attractions in Malacca
Zoos established in 1963
1963 establishments in Malaysia